is a mecha anime television series, directed by Takashi Watanabe and animated by J.C.Staff and A.C.G.T. It aired on April 9, 2014, on Tokyo MX and finished on June 26, 2014. The mecha design is by Makoto Ishiwata of Nitroplus.

A 3D film reboot of the series was planned to be released but failed to meet the Kickstarter goal back in 2016, ultimately freezing the series indefinitely.

Plot
The series takes place in an alternate version of Japan where the Meiji Restoration never happened. Instead, the foreign ships were repelled by ancient giant robots called Onigami. Japan has since remained isolated from the rest of the world.

Characters

Main hero raised in a public bathhouse in Nagasaki. He can't control his fiery energy to become the strongest man, and spends his days taking on fights. He has dominated Nagasaki, but is not satisfied. There is a certain reason for which he breaks out in hives when he touches women, and that is why he is still a virgin. However, he does not know that being a virgin has great meaning to him.

Female ninja from Iga. She was raised with strict discipline as a ninja to carry out missions with loyalty and in cold blood. For this reason, she lacks human emotions such as sympathizing with others. Her actions place highest priority on the Tokugawa Shogun family and the mission, which leads to many conflicts with Keiichiro.

She looks like a sweet little girl, but is actually half fox demon and half human. Her bushy tail is always sticking out from behind. She is a tomboy with an unyielding spirit, but has long lived as a social outcast because she is half demon. She meets Keiichiro and starts to change as she develops an affection for him.

Keiichiro's "sworn brother" who adores him unconditionally and is always accompanying him. He's not a fighter at all, but is fanatical about foreign countries and machinery and has invented many new machines. Physically weak, but tries desperately to support Keiichiro. He is proud of his slicked topknot hairstyle.

A voluptuous and beautiful “mystery woman.” She talks like an oiran, and everything she says is erotic. She confronts Keiichiro and Kiriko several times for a particular purpose. Master of kung fu and uses a giant iron fan.

Guido Verbeck

Thomas Blake Glover

Mecha
The series feature mechas referred to as Onigami, who are of supernatural origin, and standard man-made steam punk mecha called Steam Puppets. The main mecha of the series is Susanoo, based on the god from Japanese mythology who can turn into different forms depending on who the subpilot is. The other Onigami of the series are Hokoinkugutsu whose main weapon is a naginata and the four-armed Takemikazuchi; these Onigami are piloted by Hokoin and Shigeyoshi, respectively. The Steam Puppets consist of the Deku, used by the Nagisaki police, and Jokikugutsu, used by pirates led by Maika and the minions of Shigeyoshi.

Episode list

Reboot
A 3D film reboot of the series was planned to be released but failed to meet the Kickstarter goal back in 2016, ultimately freezing the series indefinitely.

References

External links
 

Action anime and manga
Alternate history anime
Anime with original screenplays
Comedy anime and manga
J.C.Staff
Mecha anime and manga
Tokyo MX original programming
Sentai Filmworks